Zbigniew Kicka (9 April 1950 – 4 May 2022) was a Polish boxer. He competed in the men's welterweight event at the 1976 Summer Olympics.

References

External links
 

1950 births
2022 deaths
Polish male boxers
Olympic boxers of Poland
Boxers at the 1976 Summer Olympics
People from Kłodzko County
Sportspeople from Lower Silesian Voivodeship
AIBA World Boxing Championships medalists
Welterweight boxers